Norwegian singer-songwriter Sigrid has recorded material for two studio albums and three extended plays (EP). She also collaborated with other artists and covered songs by others. After being encouraged by her brother Tellef to write her own songs, Sigrid wrote and released her first song "Sun" in October 2013. The song received airplay on Norwegian radio stations and was featured on Norwegian state television NRK's show Urørt. Also in 2013, she released another song titled "Two Fish" and in 2014, she signed a record deal with Petroleum Records. After graduating from high school, she moved to Bergen to pursue a career in music.

Sigrid gained attention from various record labels in 2016, eventually being signed by Island Records after performing "Don't Kill My Vibe" and "Dynamite" in the label's London office. The aforementioned label released "Don't Kill My Vibe" as Sigrid's debut single in February 2017. She co-wrote it with Martin Sjølie and was the first song off her debut EP of the same name, also released in 2017. Aside from Sjølie, Sigrid also worked with songwriters and producers Askjell, and George and Harry Flint on the EP. In the same year, she released the EP Spotify Live, which consists of live performances of her songs from Don't Kill My Vibe. Her third EP Raw followed in 2018. She co-wrote the title track with Odd Martin Skålnes, and "High Five" alongside Sjølie and Emily Warren. Sigrid was the sole writer and producer of the track "Focus (Demo)". 

Sucker Punch was released as her debut album in 2019. Together with previous collaborators, Sigrid also worked on it with new songwriters such as Noonie Bao who co-wrote "Business Dinners" and "Never Mine" and Oscar Holter, who co-wrote and produced the single "Don't Feel Like Crying". For her second studio album How to Let Go (2022), Sigrid mostly worked with songwriters and producers Caroline Ailin and Sylvester Sivertsen, with the latter producing all but one song. She once again worked with Sjølie who co-wrote and produced "Mistake Like You", and Warren who contributed to three songs, including the album's lead single "Mirror". Sigrid has further collaborated on tracks with her brother and musicians Griff, Bring Me the Horizon and Declan McKenna, the latter currently remaining unreleased. She featured on the 2020 charity single "Times Like These" as part of Live Lounge Allstars and additionally recorded songs for the soundtracks of Justice League (2017) and The Aeronauts (2019), respectively.

Songs

Unreleased songs

Notes

References

Sigrid
 List